Dikko is a surname. It may refer to:

People
Middle name
Mohammed Dikko Abubakar, Nigerian policeman and former Inspector General of Police
Muhammadu Dikko Yusufu, also known as MD Yusufu or MD Yusuf (1931–2015), Nigerian policeman, Inspector General of the Nigerian Police Force, public servant and politician

Surname
Abdullahi Dikko (born 1960), Nigerian Comptroller-General of Nigerian Customs Service
R.A.B. Dikko (1912–1977), Nigerian doctor and commissioner
Muhammadu Dikko (1865-1944), the 47th "Sarki" (Emir) of Katsina (1906-1944)
Umaru Dikko (1936–2014), Nigerian politician and minister, exiled in UK, subject of kidnapping attempt known as the Dikko Affair

See also
Dikko affair, joint Nigerian-Israeli attempt to kidnap UK-based Umaru Dikko, Nigerian former minister in 1984, and secretly transport him back to Nigeria in a diplomatic bag